Markazul Uloom Senior Secondary English School is a CBSE affiliated (Affiliation Number: 930070 ) senior secondary school established in 1983 and run by the Ansarul Islam Charitable Trust located at Kondotty, India. The trust, a non-profit charitable organisation, runs a number of educational institutions.

Features
The school follows a coeducational system and has English as the medium of instruction. The school sections include  Kindergarten (LKG and UKG), Lower Primary School (Classes 1-4), Upper Primary School (Classes 5-7), High School (Classes 8-10) and Senior Secondary school (Class XI and Class XII).

Infrastructure
 Computer Laboratory
 Smart Classroom (satellite broadcast setup)
 Language Lab
 Physics Lab
 Chemistry Lab
 Zoology and Botany Lab
 Student library
 Digital library
 Conference Hall
 School ground

See also
 Kondotty
 Malappuram

References

Schools in Malappuram district
High schools and secondary schools in Kerala
1983 establishments in Kerala
Educational institutions established in 1983